Péribonka is a municipality in the Canadian province of Quebec, located in the Maria-Chapdelaine Regional County Municipality. It is situated at the mouth of the Peribonka River where it forms a bay on the north shore of Lac Saint-Jean.

Louis Hémon (1880-1913), a French writer, spent several months in Péribonka in 1912 during which he prepared the notes for his famous novel, Maria Chapdelaine.

Peribonka comes from the Innu word periwanga (or possibly from pelipaukau), meaning "river digging in/removing the sand", from the roots per or pen, "to remove", and anga, meaning "sand".

History
In 1673, Jesuits François de Crespieul and Charles Albanel visited the place. But a village did not form until 1888 when the families of Édouard Niquet (or Niquette) and Édouard Milot arrived. Niquet had been sent there by Antoine Labelle, then Deputy Minister of Colonization of Quebec. A significant impetus to colonization came in 1897 with the founding of the Colonization and Repatriation Society of Quebec and Lac Saint-Jean, organization that encouraged the establishment of settlers and the repatriation of French-Canadian families exiled in the United States. The Peribonka Post Office opened in 1898.

Amédée Robitaille established the Peribonka Pulp Company which led to the founding of the municipality of Saint-Amédée in 1902. The following year, the Parish of Saint-Édouard-de-Peribonka was formed and named after Édouard Niquet and the adjacent river, that first got its name back in 1679. In 1909, the Municipality of Péribonka was founded by separating a portion of Saint-Amédée's territory. But in 1926, Saint-Amédée was completely annexed by Péribonka.

Demographics
Population trend:
 Population in 2021: 489 (2016 to 2021 population change: -5%)
 Population in 2016: 515 
 Population in 2011: 464
 Population in 2006: 541
 Population in 2001: 538
 Population in 1996: 588
 Population in 1991: 635

Private dwellings occupied by usual residents: 234 (total dwellings: 304)

Mother tongue:
 English as first language: 1%
 French as first language: 99%
 English and French as first language: 0%
 Other as first language: 0%

Notable natives and residents
 Louis Hémon (author of Maria Chapdelaine)
 Michel Goulet (professional ice hockey player and NHL Hall of Fame inductee)

References

Municipalities in Quebec
Incorporated places in Saguenay–Lac-Saint-Jean
Maria-Chapdelaine Regional County Municipality